Mihail Petruševski (Macedonian and ; July 2, 1911, Bitola – February 27, 1990) was a Yugoslav Macedonian academic, philologist and founder of the Faculty of Philosophy at the Skopje University. He published over 200 philosophic works, but his translation of Homer's "Iliad" and his adaptation of "Skanderbeg" by Grigor Parlichev were considered particularly significant for Macedonian culture.

Petruševski was also a committee member on the first Committee for the Standardization of the Macedonian Alphabet, and a former rector of Saints Cyril and Methodius University, Skopje.

Annotations
Name: His name is also written as "Mihailo" or "Mihajlo" (Михаило Петрушевски; Михајло Петрушевски).

References
 Macedonian Information Agency
 Rectors of the Ss. Cyril and Methodius University in Skopje

1911 births
1990 deaths
Yugoslav writers
20th-century male writers
Yugoslav philosophers
Yugoslav translators
Academic staff of the Ss. Cyril and Methodius University of Skopje
People from Bitola
Macedonian culture
20th-century translators
20th-century Serbian philosophers